Marian K. Reynolds (born February 16, 1950) is an American former politician who served in the Kansas House of Representatives and Kansas State Senate. 

Reynolds was born in Dodge City, Kansas and grew up on her family's farm in Cimarron as one of nine children. She attended community college and married Jay Reynolds. In 1974, she ran for the Kansas House as a Democrat. She defeated two other candidates in the primary election with relative ease, and then beat three-term incumbent Republican Don Spotts in the general election.  Reynolds served only a single term in the Kansas House, during which she received national and local media attention for being one of the first women to be pregnant and give birth while serving in a state legislature. She declined to run for re-election in 1976. 

After leaving the Kansas House, Reynolds took a job as a sales representative covering Western Kansas for IBM, and she and Jay Reynolds divorced in 1978. In 1992, Reynolds re-entered politics, running for the 38th district in the Kansas Senate; she opted to run as a Republican, citing her conservatism and distaste for government spending. Once again, she served only a single term; Tim Huelskamp successfully challenged her in the 1996 Republican primary, taking 62% of the vote to Reynolds' 38%.

References

1950 births
Living people
Republican Party Kansas state senators
Democratic Party members of the Kansas House of Representatives
Kansas Republicans
Kansas Democrats
People from Dodge City, Kansas
20th-century American politicians
Women state legislators in Kansas
20th-century American women politicians